The TRS-80 series of computers were sold via Radio Shack & Tandy dealers in North America and Europe in the early 1980s.  Much software was developed for these computers, particularly the relatively successful Color Computer I, II & III models, which were designed for both home office and entertainment (gaming) uses.

A list of software for the TRS-80 computer series appears below.  This list includes software that was sold labelled as a Radio Shack or Tandy product.#

Note: This List is by no means complete, especially with regards to the earlier non-color computer models.

Model I

Model II

VideoTex

Color Computer
TRS-80 Color Computer

Color Computer 1 & 2

Color Computer 3

Model III
Many of these titles also ran on the Model I, as the Model III was designed to be backward-compatible with the Model I.

Model 16 & 16B

Model 4, 4D & 4P

Model 12

MC-10

Model 100 & 102 

TRS-80 software